Zoomo may refer to:
Zoomo, an Australian ebike manufacturer
Zoomo, a subsidiary of Pacific Arts Corporation